Romeo is a 2012 Indian Kannada-language romantic comedy film written and directed by PC Shekhar, starring Ganesh and Bhavana in the lead roles. Naveen and Ramesh Kumar are the producers of this romantic love story film.

Arjun Janya composed the music and Vaidhi handled the camera work. The film released across Karnataka state on 6 July 2012.

Plot
Ganesh comes to the world by peeing on his father Kashinath's face. Despite being mischievous, he manages to reach the graduation level but with poor English-speaking skills. However, he gets a job in a bank where he meets Shruti and Panda.

As expected, their love blossoms after witnessing a series of comic scenes. Ganesh, a slum dweller and street smart, impresses her by telling a pack of lies where he went on to claim that he is born with a silver spoon and he is the son of crorepati but living an ordinary life to learn the basic lessons of life. The couple marries secretly when her father opposes their marriage and fixes a secret marriage with a rich man. However, soon Shruti realises that she was lied to and cheated, she leaves Ganesh and applies for divorce. Though Ganesh is unready to divorce her, he requests a divorce in court after six months of court fight. After divorce he realised the importance of life, love of his parents he suddenly rises in life like a phoenix. He works hard, earns some money, and changes his home. After a year of divorce, he meets Shruti again and he wants to get her back. As she was in training period of one week in Ganesh's friend's office, she is on her way back to the US, where she was residing since the divorce. Ganesh learns this and fakes an accident, which lures Shruti to return from airport to hospital to see Ganesh. Then she discovers Kashinath's plan, who was trying reunite Ganesh and Shruti. The film ends with the couple's reunion.

Cast
Ganesh as Ganesh
Bhavana as Shruti
Avinash
Sudha Belawadi
Ramesh Bhat
Rangayana Raghu as Kashinath
Sadhu Kokila as Pandu
Mithra
Taranga Vishwa 
Renuka Prasad 
Girish Shivanna 
Shanthamma 
Nagendra Shah 
M. K. Mata 
Mimicry Dayanand 
Laya Kokila 
Charna 
Master Manju 
Rockline Sudhakar
Tanisha Kuppanda

Music

Box office
Romeo was a much anticipated film and got a good opening at the box office, due to super hit songs and youth fan followings of the film's lead actor Ganesh. The film met with positive response upon release, and it went on to be commercially successful at the box office by completing a 100 day run.

Reception

Critical response 

A critic from The Times of India scored the film at 3.5 out of 5 stars and says "The first half is lively with catchy dialogues that keep you in good humour till the end. You don’t feel bored even during the sentimental sequences that occupy most part of the second half. It would have been better if the second half was trimmed by at least 15 minutes". A critic from News18 India wrote "Arjun Janya's music compositions are quite good. Shreya Ghoshal's rendering of 'Alochane' song is sure to top the charts. Vaidhi's camera work is stylish. Watch 'Romeo' despite some of its flaws. It is entertaining and engaging". A critic from Rediff.com scored the film at 2.5 out of 5 stars and wrote "The first half is hilarious, but the second half is a bit slow and has only one song to give you the musical zing. Arjun Janya has scored some good songs. Shreya Ghoshal's Alochane is a soft and lilting number". A critic from The New Indian Express wrote "Somewhere,  Ganesh’s romantic touch is also missed. Avinash, Rangayana Raghu and Sadhu Kokila have done a good job with their witty act. Dialogues by Natraja is the highlight of the film. Arjun Janya’s music is good with melodious numbers like Alochane Aradhana. Two other peppy numbers are for the front benches". B S Srivani from Deccan Herald wrote "Overall, a satisfying effort, but a bit of dismay refuses to go away. Should reciting a lie a hundred times “always” make that lie the gospel truth? The “ardour” of Romeo easily washes away one of the fast-dissolving foundations of love - trust. Moral Science has never been popular. Has it?".

Awards

Home media
The movie was released on DVD with 5.1 channel surround sound and English subtitles and VCD.

References

External links
 

2012 films
2010s Kannada-language films
2012 romantic comedy films
Films scored by Arjun Janya
Indian romantic comedy films